Paul Shields (born ) is an Irish professional rugby union footballer of the 2000s. He played at club level for Ulster Rugby and Northampton Saints, as a Hooker. He won two caps for the Ireland national team in 2003.

Ulster Rugby 
Paul Shields attained 104 caps for Ulster Rugby being the 9th member to join the 100 cap club. He has won the Celtic League and Celtic Cup. In his first year Paul was nominated as the Ulster player of the year

Northampton Saints  
Shields signed for the Northampton Saints in the 2007-08 season. Gaining praise over his pace as a hooker, he was placed on a rotational system with Dylan Hartley. In September 2009 Shields retired from professional rugby after suffering a neck injury in the March of that year.

Notes

1978 births
Living people
Irish rugby union players
Ireland international rugby union players
Northampton Saints players
Rugby union hookers
Ulster Rugby players
Ballymena R.F.C. players
Rugby union players from Belfast